The Derby du Nord (Northern Derby) is a football rivalry contested between French clubs Lille OSC and RC Lens, two of the region's most successful clubs. Both clubs are located in northern France, though in different departments: Lille in the Nord and Lens in the Pas-de-Calais. The name can refer to matches involving Lille and Valenciennes as both clubs are located within the Nord department; however, the name historically applies mainly to matches involving Lille and Lens. As a result, the Lille–Valenciennes match is sometimes referred to as the Petit Derby du Nord.

The two cities first met in 1937 when Lille were playing under the Olympique Lillois emblem. Due to each club's close proximity towards each other being separated by only  and sociological differences between each club's supporters, a fierce rivalry developed. Historically, the Derby du Nord is underpinned by social and economic differences, since the city of Lens is known as an old, working-class, industrial city and Lille as a middle-class, modern, internationally oriented one. This social class opposition is no longer relevant: both fanbases now come from lower and middle classes.

Statistics

Head-to-head record

Honours

Other statistics

See also
 Football records and statistics in France

References

External links
 Lille OSC 
 RC Lens 

French football derbies
RC Lens
Lille OSC
Football in Hauts-de-France
1937 establishments in France
Recurring sporting events established in 1937